Raul Lino da Silva, better known as Raul Lino (Lisbon, 21 November 1879 – 13 July 1974) was a Portuguese architect, designer, architectural theorist, and writer. Lino's architectural theses and studies revolved around the theory of the Casa Portuguesa (Portuguese: Portuguese house), an idealized concept of Portuguese residential architecture, planning, and lifestyle.

The cities of Cascais and Sintra, along the Portuguese Riviera, boast the largest concentration of Lino's constructions out of anywhere. Lino played an active part in the cosmopolitanization of Cascais as a summer resort for the wealthy and notable and in the continuation of Sintra as a historicist, romanticist haven.

Early life
Raul Lino da Silva was born in Lisbon, Portugal, on 21 November 1879, to a well-off construction materials merchant. His family's financial standing allowed Lino to leave Portugal, in 1890, to study in Windsor, England, for three years. Following his studies in Britain, Lino moved to Germany, where he would study under and eventually work in the atelier of German revivalist architect, Albrecht Haupt, until 1897, when Lino returned to Portugal to finish his degree in architecture.

Early career

After returning to Portugal and finishing his studies in architecture, Lino began to work in his father's construction materials business, in 1897. During this time, Lino began his travels across Portugal and his studies of the regionalisms in architecture and style, paying particular note initially to the Alentejo region.

Back to Portugal, he designed and built more than 700 projects. Many were in the Mediterranean Revival and Soft Portuguese styles.

He was a founding member of the National Academy of Fine Arts and served as its secretary in 1946.

Lino was a habitual guest writer for various Portuguese newspapers and journals, including the Diário de Notícias, the Diário Popular, and Atlantida.

A Casa Portuguesa
Lino also wrote many books and texts about the theory of the architecture of the Portuguese house, such as A Casa Portuguesa - The Portuguese House (1929), Casas Portuguesas - Portuguese Houses (1933) and L'Evolution de l'Architecture Domestique au Portugal - The Evolution of Domestic Architecture in Portugal (1937).

Selected works
Some of his most important projects were:
 House in Castilho street, 64 and 66 (Valmor Award 1930), Lisbon
 Casa dos Patudos, Alpiarça
 Tivoli Theatre, Lisbon
 João de Deus Museum and Kindergarten, Lisbon
 Gardénia Shop, Lisbon
 St. Patrick Tower, Estoril
 Montsalvat House, Estoril
 Silva Gomes House, Estoril
 Brazil Pavilion in the Portuguese World Exhibition, Lisbon
 House of Quinta da Comenda, Arrábida
 Casa de Santa Maria, Cascais
 Casa do Cipreste, Sintra
 Casa dos Penedos, Sintra
 Casa Branca, Azenhas do Mar
 Casa Branca, Oeiras

See also
Category: Mediterranean Revival architects

External links
  Raul Lino archives, Calouste Gulbenkian Foundation Art Library

20th-century Portuguese architects
Mediterranean Revival architects
1879 births
1974 deaths
People from Lisbon